The seventh season of the sitcom Full House originally aired on ABC between September 14, 1993, and May 17, 1994.

Plot
In season seven, Danny ends his relationship with Vicky after she is offered a news anchor position in New York City. Jesse ends up renovating and re-opening The Smash Club as he is the new owner. Rebecca and Jesse realize that they need to start disciplining the twins. Meanwhile, the family suffers a tremendous blow when Jesse's beloved grandfather comes for a visit and succumbs to old age in his sleep - a loss that Jesse and Michelle take the hardest. He and Joey continue their radio gig, and Joey later becomes Michelle's new soccer coach. D.J. and Steve try to make their relationship work once he starts college. D.J. is a junior in high school. Stephanie begins middle school (sixth grade), Michelle enters second grade.

Main cast 

 John Stamos as Jesse Katsopolis
 Bob Saget as Danny Tanner 
 Dave Coulier as Joey Gladstone
 Candace Cameron as D.J. Tanner
 Jodie Sweetin as Stephanie Tanner
 Mary-Kate and Ashley Olsen as Michelle Tanner
 Lori Loughlin as Rebecca Donaldson-Katsopolis
 Andrea Barber as Kimmy Gibbler
 Scott Weinger as Steve Hale
 Blake & Dylan Tuomy-Wilhoit as Nicky & Alex Katsopolis

Episodes

See also 
 List of Full House episodes

References 

General references 
 
 

1993 American television seasons
1994 American television seasons
7